Cape Blossom is a cape located on the Baldwin Peninsula in Alaska which occupies a point that extends southwestwards into Kotzebue Sound, 18 km south of Kotzebue.

This headland was named in 1826 by Royal Navy Captain Frederick William Beechey after his vessel, HMS Blossom.

Cape Blossom in Alaska should not be confused with Cape Blossom on Wrangel Island.

References

Blossom
Landforms of Northwest Arctic Borough, Alaska